USS Wissahickon has been the name of more than one United States Navy ship, and may refer to: 

, a gunboat in commission from 1861 to 1865
, named USS SP-852 for part of her career, a patrol vessel in commission from 1917 to 1919

United States Navy ship names